Myctophum punctatum is a species of mesopelagic fish in the family Myctophidae. Its common name is spotted lanternfish, sometimes spelled spotted lanterfish. It is found in the Northern Atlantic and in the Mediterranean at depths down to 1000m. It is one of the dominant species in midwater assemblages near the Mid-Atlantic Ridge.

Myctophum punctatum can grow to  SL. It performs diurnal migrations to the surface at dusk. It feeds mostly on copepods and euphausiids.

Larvae of Myctophum punctatum have stalked eyes.

References

Myctophidae
Fish of the Atlantic Ocean
Fish of the Mediterranean Sea
Fish described in 1810
Taxa named by Constantine Samuel Rafinesque